Arthur Grenville Morris (13 April 1877 – 27 November 1959) was a Welsh footballer who played in the Football League for Nottingham Forest. He is the club's all-time highest scorer with 217 goals. He also played for Aberystwyth Town and Swindon Town, and represented Wales internationally, earning 21 caps between 1896 and 1912.

Club career
Usually just known as Grenville Morris, he was born in Builth Wells, Wales. He was educated at Ellesmere College, Shropshire from May 1892 to December 1893.

Morris began playing football for his local team, Builth Wells F.C. He was still recorded as playing for this team (described as "Builth Football Club" in the press) in the Brecon County Times, of 29 December 1893, scoring a goal in a 4–1 win over Brecon. By January 1894, he was playing for Aberystwyth Town. Morris scored 111 goals for the team in 75 appearances. He moved from Aberystwyth Town to Swindon Town making his debut on 6 February 1897. At this time Swindon played in both the Southern Football League, and the Western Football League. Grenville scored on his debut for Swindon in a game away against North Fleet in the Southern League. He then scored a goal in the game at home to New Brompton in the same league a week later. He went on to play 50 games for the Robins in all competitions, scoring 44 goals. This total consisted of 31 appearances in the Southern League, scoring 23 goals. Sixteen appearances in the Western League, scoring 20 goals. And three appearances in the FA Cup, with 1 goal. He was one of the greatest players of his generation and was known as The Prince of the Inside-Lefts.

Morris moved on to Nottingham Forest in 1898 for a sum of £200. He still holds Forest's all-time goal scoring record with 217 in all competitions.

International

On 29 February 1896, at the age of 18 years and 321 days old he won his first full international Welsh cap against Ireland, scoring a goal in a 6–1 victory. It took place at the Racecourse Ground in Wrexham. Morris went on to play 21 times for his country, the last 16 of which were whilst he was with Forest. His last Welsh cap came on 11 March 1912 against England. He scored a total of nine goals in international football.

Career statistics

Club

International

Honours

Nottingham Forest
Football League Second Division: 1906–07

References

External links
 Aberystwyth career profile
 Ellesmere College, Shropshire

1877 births
1959 deaths
People from Builth Wells
Sportspeople from Powys
Welsh footballers
Wales international footballers
Nottingham Forest F.C. players
Swindon Town F.C. players
Association football forwards
Aberystwyth Town F.C. players
Builth Wells F.C. players